The Constitution Party is a political party in Egypt. Founded by Nobel Peace Prize laureate Mohammad ElBaradei in 2012, it aims to protect and promote the principles and objectives of the 2011 Egyptian revolution, according to liberal ideals.

Background
The party was launched on 28 April 2012 by Mohammad ElBaradei and a group of Egyptian intellectuals and activists. ElBaradei described that the aim of the party was "to save the great 25 January revolution, which has been derailed and is almost aborted, and to restore our unity." The party was seen as a moderate force to counter emerging Islamist gains. ElBaradei said that he intended to increase the party's base for the next election in four years time. The party aims to unite all Egyptians, regardless of creed or ideology, behind democracy.

ElBaradei hoped the party would attract, in particular, the young people who were behind the uprising that toppled President Mubarak. The Constitution Party has attracted a youthful membership, with over 85% of its membership being under the age of 35. Youth leaders of the Constitution Party have at times expressed differences with party leadership, contributing to the internal dynamics influencing the party's development.

The Constitution Party supported the Tamarod movement and the removal of President Mohamed Morsi in June 2013. ElBaradei was appointed interim vice president by Adly Mansour but resigned one month later, in August 2013, over the use of violence against pro-Muslim Brotherhood protesters. The resignation led to distancing between the Constitution Party and the party founder. A number of Constitution leaders resigned from the party after ElBaradei's resignation from the interim vice presidency. ElBaradei is no longer involved with the party though he was named honorary president of the party on 22 February 2014.

The former spokesman of the party, Khaled Dawoud, was stabbed on 4 October 2013. A day later his condition had improved.

The party announced an official neutral position on the January 2014 constitutional referendum but strongly encouraged Egyptians to participate.

Hala Shukrallah was elected to lead the Constitution Party in February 2014, becoming both the first woman and first Christian to lead a major Egyptian party.

The party endorsed Hamdeen Sabahi in the 2014 presidential election.

Platform
The Constitution Party "aims to build a new Egypt based on democratic governance, education, competence, experience and the rule of law." Respect for human rights, advancing the Egyptian economy, providing for the basic needs of citizens, and advancing social equality are among the party's primary goals. The principles of the party are summarized in its slogan, "Bread, Freedom, and Social Justice."

Principles of the Party
Citizenship and wise governance.
The State's role in economic development.
The State's responsibility for social justice.
Peaceful Political Activism.
Self-reliance, Preservation of identity and openness to the world.

Leaders

Prominent figures
Mohammad ElBaradei, founding member and honorary president
George Ishak, founding member
Emad Abou Ghazi, founding member
Mohamed Soliman, founding member
Ahmed Harara, founding member
Mohamed Yousri Salama, founding member
Gameela Ismail, founding member
Hossam Eissa, founding member
Khaled Dawoud, former spokesman for the Constitution Party.
Hala Shukrallah, elected to lead the party in February 2014.
Tarek Hussein, Deputy head for Committee of rights and freedoms.

See also 
 List of political parties in Egypt

References

External links
 
Dostour Party Founders list

2012 establishments in Egypt
Centre-left parties in Asia
Egyptian democracy movements
Liberal parties in Egypt
Political parties established in 2012
Social liberal parties